The Delaware Water Gap Toll Bridge (also known as the Interstate 80 Toll Bridge) is a toll bridge that carries Interstate 80 across the Delaware River at the Delaware Water Gap, connecting Hardwick Township, Warren County, New Jersey, and Delaware Water Gap, Monroe County, Pennsylvania, in the United States. The bridge was built by the Delaware River Joint Toll Bridge Commission. The  bridge is a multiple span dual roadway with a steel plate structure.

The facility opened to the public on December 16, 1953, at ceremonies attended by Governor of Pennsylvania John S. Fine and Governor of New Jersey Alfred E. Driscoll. The bridge carried US 611 (now Pennsylvania Route 611) for four miles (6 km) in New Jersey to a connection with Route 94. I-80 was routed onto the bridge in 1959.

There is a pedestrian sidewalk on the south side of the New Jersey-bound section of the bridge, separated from motor vehicles with a concrete divider. The pedestrian walkway on the Delaware Water Gap Toll Bridge connects Pennsylvania's northern terminus of the Appalachian Trail with New Jersey's southern end. The Delaware Water Gap National Recreation Area straddles both sides of the river near the bridge; Worthington State Forest is located along the bridge's New Jersey side.

A six-lane toll plaza, one of which is an Express E-ZPass lane, is located on the Pennsylvania side of the bridge, serving westbound traffic only. The cash toll for automobiles is $3.00. E-ZPass users pay $1.25, with a 20% commuter discount available to those making 16 or more tolled trips in a calendar month.

See also
 List of crossings of the Delaware River

References

External links
Delaware Water Gap Toll Bridge at the Delaware River Joint Toll Bridge Commission website
 

Delaware River Joint Toll Bridge Commission
1953 establishments in New Jersey
1953 establishments in Pennsylvania
Bridges over the Delaware River
Hardwick Township, New Jersey
Interstate 80
Toll bridges in New Jersey
Toll bridges in Pennsylvania
Tolled sections of Interstate Highways
Bridges in Warren County, New Jersey
Bridges completed in 1953
Delaware Water Gap
Beam bridges
Bridges in Monroe County, Pennsylvania
Road bridges in New Jersey
Road bridges in Pennsylvania
Bridges on the Interstate Highway System
Appalachian Trail
Steel bridges in the United States
Interstate vehicle bridges in the United States